The 2000 Croatian Cup Final was a two-legged affair played between Hajduk Split and Dinamo Zagreb. 
The first leg was played in Split on 2 May 2000, while the second leg on 16 May 2000 in Zagreb.

Hajduk Split won the trophy with an aggregate result of 2–1.

The final was overshadowed by the clashes between both clubs supporters and police in the first leg at Stadion Poljud in Split. The first leg was abandoned in 86th minute and was registered with the result that was reached 2–0, and Hajduk Split was punished by having their three matches behind closed doors.

Road to the final

First leg

Second leg

References

External links
Official website 

Croatian Football Cup Finals
HNK Hajduk Split matches
GNK Dinamo Zagreb matches
Cup